Dufault is a surname. Notable people with the surname include:

Austin Dufault, American basketball player
Danielle Dufault, Canadian artist
François Dufault, French Baroque composer and lutenist
Jeremie Dufault, Member of the Washington House of Representatives from the 15th district, attorney, and businessman
Luce Dufault (born 1966), Canadian singer
Maryeve Dufault (born 1982), Canadian-American racing driver
Peter Kane Dufault (1923–2013), American poet
Pierre Dufault, Canadian journalist and sports commentator
Renee Dufault, Food and Drug Administration researcher and whistleblower
Zach DuFault, actor